William Henry Frederick Fiedler (August 25, 1847January 1, 1919) was an American Democratic Party politician who represented New Jersey's 6th congressional district in the United States House of Representatives for one term from 1883 to 1885.

Biography
Fiedler was born in New York City on August 25, 1847. He moved to New Jersey with his parents, who settled in Newark. He attended the public and high schools, and apprenticed to the hat-finishing trade at the age of fifteen.

Political career
He was employed as a clerk and engaged in the retail hat and later in the men's clothing business. He was elected an alderman of Newark in 1876 and 1878, and was a member of the New Jersey General Assembly in 1878 and 1879. He served as mayor of Newark from 1880–1882, and was an unsuccessful candidate for reelection in 1881. He served  again as a member of the General Assembly in 1882.

He was elected as a Democrat to the Forty-eighth Congress, serving in office from March 4, 1883 – March 3, 1885, but was an unsuccessful candidate for reelection.

Later career and death
After leaving Congress, he was appointed postmaster of Newark on March 29, 1886, and served until October 1, 1889. He resumed his former business pursuits until 1905, when he engaged in the real estate business and in banking. He was an unsuccessful candidate for mayor in 1904.

He died in Newark on January 1, 1919, and was interred in Fairmount Cemetery in Newark.

External links

William Henry Frederick Fiedler at The Political Graveyard

1847 births
1919 deaths
Democratic Party members of the New Jersey General Assembly
Burials at Fairmount Cemetery (Newark, New Jersey)
Mayors of Newark, New Jersey
Democratic Party members of the United States House of Representatives from New Jersey
19th-century American politicians